Paracles is a genus of moths in the subfamily Arctiinae. The genus was described by Francis Walker in 1855. The species range from Panama to Patagonia, with quite a few in the southern temperate region of South America.

Species
Paracles affinis (Rothschild, 1910)
Paracles albescens (Hampson, 1901)
Paracles alonia (Schaus, 1933)
Paracles amarga (Schaus, 1933)
Paracles antennata (Walker, 1855)
Paracles argentina (Berg, 1877)
Paracles aurantiaca (Rothschild, 1910)
Paracles azollae (Berg, 1877)
Paracles bilinea (Schaus, 1901)
Paracles bogotensis (Dognin, 1916)
Paracles brittoni (Rothschild, 1910)
Paracles brunnea (Hübner, [1831])
Paracles burmeisteri (Berg, 1877)
Paracles cajetani (Rothschild, 1910)
Paracles cnethocampoides (Rothschild, 1910)
Paracles contraria Walker, 1855
Paracles costata (Burmeister, 1878)
Paracles deserticola (Berg, 1875)
Paracles discalis (Reich, 1933)
Paracles dukinfieldia (Schaus, 1896)
Paracles elongata (Rothschild, 1922)
Paracles emerita (Schaus, 1933)
Paracles felderi (Rothschild, 1910)
Paracles fervida (Schaus, 1901)
Paracles flavescens (Schaus, 1896)
Paracles fosterana Watson & Goodger, 1986
Paracles fosteri (Hampson, 1905)
Paracles fulvicollis (Hampson, 1905)
Paracles fusca (Walker, 1856)
Paracles gigantea (E. D. Jones, 1908)
Paracles haenschi (Rothschild, 1910)
Paracles herbuloti (Toulgoët, 1975)
Paracles honora (Schaus, 1896)
Paracles insipida (Rothschild, 1910)
Paracles juruana (Butler, 1878)
Paracles klagesi (Rothschild, 1910)
Paracles laboulbeni (Bar, 1873)
Paracles laguerrei Toulgoët, 2000
Paracles lateralis (Walker, 1855)
Paracles lehmanni (Rothschild, 1910)
Paracles magna (Rothschild, 1910)
Paracles marcona (Schaus, 1933)
Paracles nitida (E. D. Jones, 1908)
Paracles obscurior (Schaus, 1933)
Paracles ockendeni (Rothschild, 1910)
Paracles pallidivena (Schaus, 1904)
Paracles palmeri (Rothschild, 1910)
Paracles palustris (Jörgensen, 1935)
Paracles paula (Schaus, 1896)
Paracles pectinalis E. D. Jones, 1908
Paracles persimilis (Burmeister, 1878)
Paracles peruensis (Dognin, 1907)
Paracles peruviana (Rothschild, 1910)
Paracles phaeocera (Hampson, 1905)
Paracles plectoides (Maassen, 1890)
Paracles postflavida (Rothschild, 1922)
Paracles quadrata (Rothschild, 1910)
Paracles reversa (E. D. Jones, 1908)
Paracles rudis Butler, 1882
Paracles sericea (Schaus, 1896)
Paracles severa (Berg, 1875)
Paracles steinbachi (Rothschild, 1910)
Paracles surgens (Walker, [1865])
Paracles tapina (Dyar, 1913)
Paracles tenuis (Berg, 1877)
Paracles thursbyi (Rothschild, 1910)
Paracles tolimensis (Dognin, 1912)
Paracles toulgoeti Watson & Goodger, 1986
Paracles ubiana (Druce, 1898)
Paracles uniformis (E. D. Jones, 1912)
Paracles uruguayensis (Berg, 1886)
Paracles valstana (Schaus, 1933)
Paracles variegata (Schaus, 1896)
Paracles venata (Schaus, 1894)
Paracles vivida (Rothschild, 1910)
Paracles vulpecula (Dognin, 1907)
Paracles vulpina (Hübner, [1825])

References

 
Arctiini
Moth genera